Alexeyeva is a rural locality (a village) in Karachevsky District, Bryansk Oblast, Russia. The population was 230 as of 2010. There are 7 streets.

Geography 
Alexeyeva is located 24 km south of Karachev (the district's administrative centre) by road. Dyukareva is the nearest rural locality.

References 

Rural localities in Karachevsky District